Ocean, New Jersey may refer to:
Ocean City, New Jersey
Ocean Township, Monmouth County, New Jersey
Ocean Township, Ocean County, New Jersey
 Ocean County, New Jersey
It may also be confused with: 

 Ocean Gate, New Jersey
 Ocean Grove, New Jersey
 Oceanport, New Jersey